Malaysia competed at the 1972 Summer Olympics in Munich, West Germany. 45 competitors, 42 men and 3 women, took part in 20 events in 6 sports.

Athletics

Men
Track events

Women
Track event

Combined events – Pentathlon

Cycling

Four cyclists represented Malaysia in 1972.

Road

Track
Sprint

Time trial

Football

Men's tournament
Squad

Head coach: Jalil Che Din

Group A

Ranked 10th in final standings

Hockey

Men's tournament
Team roster

 Khairuddin Zainal
 Francis Belavantheran
 Sri Shanmuganathan
 Brian Santa Maria
 Phang Poh Meng
 Wong Choon Hin
 Singaram Balasingam
 Sayed Samat
 Sulaiman Saibot
 Franco de Cruz
 Murugesan Mahendran
 Harnahal Singh Sewa
 Yang Siow Ming
 Omar Mohamed Razali Yeop
 Ramalingam Pathmarajah

Group A

Fifth to eighth place classification

Seventh and eighth place match

Ranked 8th in final standings

Shooting

Mixed

Swimming

Men

Women

References

External links
 Official Olympic Reports

Nations at the 1972 Summer Olympics
1972